Cheezburger, Inc., previously known as Pet Holdings, Inc., is the parent and holding company for the Cheezburger Network, a collection of websites best known for I Can Has Cheezburger?, Fail Blog, I Hasa Hot Dog, and others.

Websites

I Can Has Cheezburger?
I Has A Hotdog
Very Demotivational
Acting Like Animals
Babies Making Faces
Comixed
Cracked.com
Crazy Things Parents Say
Friends of Irony
My Food Looks Funny

FAIL Blog
There I Fixed It
Engrish Funny
Failbooking
Learn From My Fail
Monday Through Friday
Poorly Dressed
Probably Bad News
That Will Buff Out
Wedinator

ROFLrazzi
GraphJam
Up Next In Sports
Pundit Kitchen
Totally Looks Like
Ridiculous Poses
Tweetbaggery
The Daily What

Picture Is Unrelated
This Is Photobomb
Autocomplete Me
Lovely Listing
Hacked IRL
Oddly Specific

It Made My Day
EpicWinFTW
Once Upon A Win

Babysaur
Memebase
Know Your Meme
Daily Squee
Epicute
Must Have Cute

References

Companies based in Seattle
Online mass media companies of the United States